Grignard is a lunar impact crater on the lunar near side near the northern pole. The crater is located Northeast of Sylvester crater (diameter of 58 km) and is directly adjacent to the Hermite crater (diameter of 104 km). The crater was adopted and named after French chemist Victor Grignard by the IAU in 2009.

External links
 LAC-1 area - Map of northern lunar pole

References

 
 
 
 
 
 
 
 
 
 
 
 

LQ01 quadrangle
Impact craters on the Moon